Pramod Maheshwari (born 6 May 1971) is an Indian educator and entrepreneur and currently Founder Chairman, CEO and MD of Career Point Ltd. a Kota, India-based Education Company that runs Cram school for various examinations.

An IIT Delhi alumnus and physics teacher, Pramod founded Career Point in 1993 as a professional tutoring company from a small garage and 50 students as a very humble beginning. His company now coaches more than 25,000 students every year.
He has also set-up four private universities, two engineering colleges and numerous schools across India.

Early life 
Born on 6 May 1971, as a second son to a grain trader, Pramod belonged to a traditional Marwari family. He studied at IIT Delhi. Pramod graduated in 1993 the same year he founded Career Point.

Awards and honours 
Pramod Maheshwari was honoured with Star CEO Award during the 3rd BT–YES Bank SME Awards held in 2012 in New Delhi.

References 

1971 births
Living people
21st-century Indian educators